No. 662 Squadron was a Royal Air Force Air Observation Post squadron associated with the 21st Army Group and later part of the Royal Auxiliary Air Force. Numbers 651 to 663 Squadrons of the RAF were Air Observation Post units working closely with Army units in artillery spotting and liaison. A further three of these squadrons, 664–666, were manned with Canadian personnel. Their duties and squadron numbers were transferred to the Army with the formation of the Army Air Corps on 1 September 1957. It is now an Apache Helicopter Squadron.

History

Formation and early years
No. 662 Squadron was formed at RAF Old Sarum on 30 September 1943 with the Auster III which gave way to the Auster IV in March 1944. The squadron role was to support the British 21st Army Group in June 1944 when it moved to France. It briefly flew from Nordhorn in Germany from 7-10 April 1945. The squadron supported the Army until the end of the war when it was disbanded on 15 December 1945 at Melsbroek in Belgium.

Post war
After the war the Air Observation Squadrons were reformed and No. 662 Squadron Royal Auxiliary Air Force was reformed as such at RAF Colerne on 1 May 1949, also operating a flight from RAF Middle Wallop, to provide support to the Army in the West Country until it was disbanded at RAF Colerne on 10 March 1957.

No. 1956 Air Observation Post Flight was formed within 662 Squadron along with No. 1962 Air Observation Post Flight and No. 1963 Air Observation Post Flight.

Aircraft operated

See also
List of Royal Air Force aircraft squadrons

References

Notes

Bibliography

External links

 Squadron history for nos. 651–670 sqn. at RAF Web
 662 sqn. page of RAF website

Aircraft squadrons of the Royal Air Force in World War II
662 Squadron
Military units and formations established in 1943
Military units and formations disestablished in 1957